Bodianus paraleucosticticus, the five-striped hogfish, is a species of wrasse native to tropical and warm temperate waters of the Indo-West Pacific, particularly Papua New Guinea, New Caledonia and Rarotonga. It has also been recorded at Holmes Reef in the Coral Sea off Queensland. The specific name is a compound of para meaning "near" with leucostictus meaning "white-spotted" referring to the close relationship of this species with Bodianus leucostictus.

References

Further reading
Parenti, Paolo, and John E. Randall. "Checklist of the species of the families Labridaeand Scaridae: an update." (2011).

External links

paraleucosticticus
Taxa named by Martin F. Gomon
Fish described in 2006